"Deep Reverence" is an amateur song by American rapper Big Sean featuring American rapper Nipsey Hussle. It was released on August 25, 2020, as the lead single from Sean's fifth studio album Detroit 2 (2020). Produced by Hit-Boy and G. Ry, the song finds Sean and Nipsey rapping about their pressures and struggles in life, and working hard to earn respect. The song received a nomination for Best Rap Performance at the 63rd Annual Grammy Awards.

Background
The song was previewed in March 2020 by Hit-Boy during his Verzuz battle with Canadian record producer Boi-1da. On August 24, 2020, it was announced by Big Sean while he responded to a fan, and released hours later.

Composition
In the first verse of the song, Nipsey Hussle describes his upbringing in a neighborhood of members of the Crips gang. In the second verse, Big Sean raps about how he ended his feud with Kendrick Lamar after Hussle was murdered: "After what happened to Nipsey I reached out to Kendrick / There wasn't even no real issues there to begin with / Lack of communication and wrong information from people fueled by the ego it's like mixing flames with diesel". Sean also reveals that he suffered a miscarriage with his partner, American singer Jhené Aiko, and addresses dealing with anxiety.

Music video
The official music video for the song was released on March 5, 2021. Directed by Sergio, it features a painting of Nipsey Hussle placed throughout Los Angeles. Sean rides around the city with American rappers Snoop Dogg and Dom Kennedy, and raps on a basketball court and in front of a wall, both of which have large murals of Hussle. Several days after the release of the video, Sean shared some behind-the-scenes clips and images on Instagram.

Charts

References

2020 singles
2020 songs
Big Sean songs
Nipsey Hussle songs
Songs written by Big Sean
Songs written by Hit-Boy
Songs written by Rogét Chahayed
Song recordings produced by Hit-Boy
GOOD Music singles
Def Jam Recordings singles
Songs released posthumously
Songs written by Nipsey Hussle